Golola Moses (born 22 May 1980) is a Ugandan self-made celebrity, entertainer,kickboxer, actor, philanthropist, businessman and investor known for building his personal brand.

While his actual accomplishments as a kick boxer have been questioned by the media in Uganda, with accusations ranging from rigged events  to outright fraud, Golola has, nevertheless, been credited with popularizing the sport of kickboxing in Uganda (a discipline which previously generated minimal fan interest in Uganda) and has managed to build up a large fan following in Uganda. His 2011 fight against Abdul Qadir Rahim managed to attract the largest attendance in Uganda outside of Ugandan national football team matches and Golola has perhaps the largest fan following in Uganda outside of the national football team.

Golola has one of the largest online fan bases of anyone in Uganda. His fans have created various memes associated with Golola and even their own parody version of Downfall, starring Golola. He was also given the lead role in the Ugandan movie Christmas in Kampala.

Golola is known for his humorous personality and flamboyant showmanship, traits which have helped him to popularize the sport of kickboxing in Uganda and helped him to gain a large fan following.

He is the Kickboxing Champion of East and Central Africa having emerged winner in a controversial match against Hungarian Andras Nagy on 9 December 2011. Golola was involved in a financial dispute with his promoter at that time, Patrick Kanyomozi, and claimed that he was owed 30 million Ugandan shillings as his part of a 40–60 split from the fight. The dispute later caused him to split with Kanyomozi and introduce his own brother as his promoter.

Moses Vs Umar Semata 
Umar Semata is a Ugandan kickboxer based in Thailand. For over five years since he came to fame with his spectacular records in Thailand, fans have been divided on who is better than the other. Moses Golola is experienced in K1-Style and has beaten every Ugandan kickboxer who comes by his way such as Titus Tugume, Abu Kikenwa among others. Semata is a Muay thai fighter which is a little bit different from K1.

However, all this was settled on the night of 13 October 2018 when the two faced off in the ring at Freedom City Mall. The fight ended when Umar Semata had stopped Golola's dominance of local kickboxers after the judges awarded him a victory by unanimous decision. Meanwhile, till now Moses Golola says he did not lose the fight as it was not staged according to the agreed upon instructions of seven rounds instead of five.

References 

1980 births
Living people
Ugandan male kickboxers